World War I was a 1914–1918 global war.

World War One may also refer to:

 The Seven Years' War (1756–1763), between Great Britain and France, described by Winston Churchill as the "first world war"
 World War One (TV series), a 1964–1965 American documentary television series
 World War One (video game), a 2008 strategy video game, published by Ascaron Entertainment